Chicago and North Western 175 is a preserved standard gauge class "R-1" 4-6-0 "Ten Wheeler" type steam locomotive. Built by ALCO in 1908, the locomotive was used for pulling various passenger and freight trains throughout Wisconsin, until the Chicago and North Western Railway ended steam operations in 1957. In 1964, the locomotive was leased to Clint Jones, who had plans to use it on the Keweenaw Central Railroad for excursion service alongside Copper Range 2-8-0 No. 29, but restoration work was never completed under his ownership. After spending over four decades in outdoor storage in Hancock, Michigan, No. 175 was purchased in 2018 by the Steam Railroading Institute, who moved to their location in Owosso, Michigan, and they are currently rebuilding the locomotive to serve as a running mate to Pere Marquette 2-8-4 No. 1225.

History

Original service life 
No. 175 was the 302nd member out of 325 R-1 class 4-6-0 "ten-wheeler" types constructed by the American Locomotive Company (ALCO)'s former Schenectady Locomotive Works in Schenectady, New York and the Baldwin Locomotive Works in Philadelphia, Pennsylvania for the Chicago and North Western Railway (C&NW), also known as the North Western. No. 175 was the second locomotive of the final batch of twenty-five R-1 ten-wheelers built by ALCO in December 1908. The locomotives of the final batch were built with Walschaerts valve gear, as opposed to internal Stephenson valve gear, like the older locomotives had. The North Western assigned the locomotive along with most of the other R-1s to pull mainline freight trains, as well as occasional passenger trains, throughout Wisconsin, Illinois, and the Upper Peninsula of Michigan. When the North Western began purchasing larger locomotives, such as the E-2 class 4-6-2 "Pacifics", the R-1s were reassigned to pulling trains on branch lines and yard switching.

In the mid-1920s, the North Western began modifying their R-1s to improve their performances. No. 175, in particular, received a new superheated boiler with a larger firebox, which increased the locomotive's overall weight, but didn't increase the boiler pressure or the tractive effort. By 1950, the North Western sold multiple of their R-1s for scrap, and No. 175 was purely reassigned for shortline freight service. On September 24, 1957, the North Western used No. 175 to pull a few mainline "farewell to steam" excursion trains throughout the state of Wisconsin. One of these trips included one between Green Bay and Three Lakes that helped fund and promote the future opening of the National Railroad Museum. Its final trip ended in Antigo before it officially became the last steam locomotive to retire from the North Western.

Preservation 
There were possible considerations of donating No. 175 to the National Railroad Museum, due to one of its fan trip’s contributions to the museum. After sitting idle for four years, No. 175 was instead sold in 1961 to the Winona County Historical Society of Winona, Minnesota, who possibly had plans to put the locomotive on outdoor static display. In 1964, though, Michigan businessman Clint Jones purchased No. 175 from the Winona group with the hopes of rebuilding it to pull his own excursion trains, but it wasn't until 1967, when he decided that it would run for his newly formed Keweenaw Central Railroad. The Keweenaw Central lied for thirteen miles between Calumet and Lake Linden, Michigan on active trackage owned by the Copper Range Railroad. Ex-Copper Range 2-8-0 "Consolidation" type No. 29 was the main motive power for their excursion runs, but No. 175 was selected as a standby for when No. 29 would suffer a mechanical problem. Many of the locomotive's components were removed, and with the original tender being in poor condition, it was sold for scrap and replaced with a larger tender from a Northern Pacific (NP) 4-6-2, which carried less water and more coal.

However, No. 175's rebuild for the Keweenaw Central was never completed. In 1972, the Copper Range declared bankruptcy, and all of their remaining trackage was abandoned and mostly ripped up. Consequently, the Keweenaw Central was forced to remove their equipment from Calumet, and Numbers 175 and 29 were moved inside one of the sheds at the Quincy Smelter plant in Hancock for storage. Afterwards, the Soo Line Railroad abandoned and ripped up the only trackage that connected the plant to the national rail network, and Jones couldn't afford to remove his two locomotives from the property by truck. As a result of this, No. 175 spent the next four and a half decades in Hancock, and during that time, the shed that No. 175 was stored inside of collapsed, and it was towed outdoors. Although No. 175's boiler, frame, running gear, and NP tender were exposed to the elements, many of the locomotives other components were stored inside an undisclosed facility owned by Jones' new company, Mineral Range Incorporated.

In 2004, No. 29 was traded and moved to the Mid-Continent Railway Museum (MCRM) (who also owns fellow C&NW R-1 class No. 1385) in North Freedom, leaving No. 175 the last remaining locomotive to be stored by the abandoned Quincy plant, which was now owned by the National Park Service. Around the same time, the Langlade County Historical Society of Antigo made Mineral Range an offer to sell them No. 175, since they were looking for a steam locomotive to display at their heritage center, and No. 175 held historical significance at Antigo. However, Mineral Range turned the offer down, and instead, they sold them Ex-Union Pacific 2-8-0 No. 440, a locomotive that they had received from the MCRM in exchange for No. 29. In the late summer of 2017, the owners and operators of the Steam Railroading Institute (SRI) arranged a meeting with Mineral Range, who offered the SRI to purchase No. 175. On January 19, 2018, the SRI announced that they reached an agreement with Mineral Range, and they purchased No. 175 to rebuild it for operational purposes as a running mate to Pere Marquette 2-8-4 "Berkshire" No. 1225. Although, the SRI had previously been refurbishing Ex-Mississippian 2-8-0 No. 76, but that project was cancelled, since No. 76 was in poor mechanical shape, and it didn’t qualify for grants, since none of the railroads No. 76 served had any cultural significance in the state of Michigan, whereas No. 175, being a Chicago and North Western locomotive, had operated for a number of times out of Escanaba in the Upper Peninsula, so it would be more applicable for state grants, and many of its smaller components were still in good condition as a result of being stored indoors.

Beginning in the late spring, No. 175's boiler was separated from its frame and running gear by crane, and they were both separately placed onto different flatbeds. The locomotive had been separated and loaded onto four flatbeds in order to pass the weight restrictions of the Mackinac Bridge to enter the Lower Peninsula by road. On June 5, the locomotive's components arrived at the SRI's location in Owosso, and they were securely loaded off the following day. Once the move was completed, SRI crews began inspecting the locomotive's components to find out which ones were restorable and which ones needed replacing. The boiler has been cleaned, scraped, and painted, and ultrasonic tests showed that the boiler's vessels had an adequate amount of thickness, but the lower plates of the firebox needed to be replaced, as do the flues, tubes, and flue sheets. No. 175's rebuild to run again originally had an estimated cost of $750,000 before the cost was later estimated again to over $1,000,000, making it surpass No. 1225's 2013 rebuild as the SRI's most expensive locomotive restoration project. On July 5, 2022, with support from a federal Transportation Alternatives Program (TAP) grant administered by the Michigan Department of Transportation (MDOT), the SRI launched a campaign called "Revive 175" to raise $400,000 from donors. On August 29, No. 175's frame and running gear was loaded back onto a flatbed of a truck to be shipped to the shop facilities of Gramling Locomotive Works in Ashley, Indiana to be refurbished there. Once the locomotive is operational again, No. 175 will be used to pull several excursion trains on the Great Lakes Central Railroad (GLC) alongside No. 1225, and it would expand the SRI's operational locomotive fleet.

Historical significance 
C&NW No. 175 hauled the North Western's last steam-powered train in 1957, and it was the last steam locomotive to operate in Antigo, Wisconsin. Although, it is one of three surviving examples of the C&NW's R-1 class, No. 175 is the last remaining R-1 to be superheated and to be equipped with Walschaerts valve gear. It is also the only existing C&NW steam locomotive that is preserved in the state of Michigan.

See also 

 Soo Line 1003
 Soo Line 2719
 Duluth and Northern Minnesota 14
 Union Pacific 1243
 St. Louis-San Francisco 1630

References

External links 

 Steam Railroading Institute - current owners of C&NW 175.

Railway locomotives introduced in 1908
175
4-6-0 locomotives
Individual locomotives of the United States
ALCO locomotives
Preserved steam locomotives of Michigan
Standard gauge locomotives of the United States